Now is the second studio album of Chinese singer Bibi Zhou, released on December 18, 2007.

Track listing
 "Liuyang River 2008" (浏阳河2008) feat. Li Guyi – 4:05
 "Anniversary" (一周年) – 3:59
 "Ah Feng" (阿凤) – 3:56
 "Believe in Love" (相信爱情) – 3:39
 "City of Angels" (天使之城) – 4:07
 "That Me Told Myself" (那个我对我说) – 3:42
 "Each Other" (彼此) – 3:46
 "How Are You" (你好吗) feat. Nicky Lee – 3:39
 "Love Is Hard" (爱好难) – 3:47
 "The Future Is Now" (未来就是现在) – 3:53

2007 albums
Bibi Zhou albums